Chris Douglas (born ) is an American football coach. He is the head football coach at Lyon College in Batesville, Arkansas, a position he has held since April 2020. Douglas also served as the head football coach at Southwestern College in Winfield, Kansas from 2002 to 2006 and MacMurray College in Jacksonville, Illinois from 2011 to 2019. 
Douglas is a native of Poteau, Oklahoma.

Head coaching record

College

References

External links
 Lyon profile
 MacMurray profile

Year of birth missing (living people)
Living people
Abilene Christian Wildcats football coaches
Jamestown Jimmies football coaches
Lyon Scots football coaches
MacMurray Highlanders football coaches
Southwestern Moundbuilders football coaches
High school football coaches in Oklahoma
Junior college football coaches in the United States
Southwestern College (Kansas) alumni
Wichita State University alumni
People from Poteau, Oklahoma
Coaches of American football from Oklahoma